Psittacanthus cordatus is a species of Neotropical mistletoe in the family Loranthaceae, which is native to Bolivia and
Brazil.

Description
Psittacanthus cordatus initially grows upward and then becomes pendulous, with the shape of its stems being circular. The leaves are opposite, with the base of the leaf
being obtuse to cordate, and the apex, acute. The position of the racemose inflorescence is both axillary and terminal. 
The flowers form groups of three (triads) on a stem, and are red to yellow.   The style is straight.

Habitat
It is found in the Amazon Rainforest, the Central Brazilian Savanna, Atlantic Rainforest and Pantanal, in the 
Caatinga, Carrasco Vegetation, Cerrado ecoregion,
Riverine Forest and/or Gallery Forest, Terra Firme Forest, flooded forest (Várzea), and
Tropical Rain Forest.

Taxonomy
Psittacanthus cordatus was first described by Hoffmansegg in 1829 as Loranthus cordatus, and in 1834, Don assigned it to the new genus Psittacanthus. There is some confusion with respect to the accepted name: Plants of the World online and Flora do Brasil give the accepted name as Psittacanthus cordatus (Hoffmans.) G.Don, while GBIF gives the accepted name as Psittacanthus cordatus Blume.

Etymology
Psittacanthus comes from the Greek psittakos (parrot), and the Greek anthos (flower), chosen according to Don, possibly because  of the bright colours.   Cordatus is the Latin for cordate or heart-shaped

References

cordatus
Flora of Brazil
Flora of Bolivia
Taxa named by George Don